The Fallen Leaves is an 1879 novel by Wilkie Collins. It details Amelius Goldenheart, an American Christian Socialist's, sojourn to England after exile from his Utopian commune, and his difficulties when elements of his past life resurface. The book was dedicated to Caroline Graves.

References

1879 novels
England in fiction
Novels set in England